Puerto Varas, also known as "La ciudad de las rosas" or “the city of roses”, is a city and commune located in the southern Chilean province of Llanquihue, in the Los Lagos Region.

The city is famous for its German traditions, its natural environment, and its popularity as a tourist destination. It enjoys a scenic location close to mountains, lakes, forests and national parks. The conical Osorno Volcano and the snowcapped peaks of Mt. Calbuco and Mt. Tronador are clearly visible from the lakefront. Puerto Varas is the southernmost of a string of towns on the western shore of Llanquihue Lake that includes Frutillar, Llanquihue and Puerto Octay.

History
The original of the city of Puerto Varas date to 1853 and is named after Antonio Varas, the Minister of the Interior at the time. It was founded by German immigrants who settled the shores of Lake Llanquihue as part of a government colonization project during the presidency of Manuel Montt (1851-1861).

The area known as the "Llanquihue Lake Colonization Territory" was created by the government on 27 June 1853, and by the end of 1853, the first 212 German families had immigrated to what would be Puerto Varas.

The first area to be settled was known as La Fabrica, where the road from Puerto Montt and the coast reached Llanquihue Lake. Other landmarks in its early history include the opening of a Catholic church in 1872 and the founding of the Deutscher Verein ("German Club") in 1885. The town received official status in the form of a Título de Villa ("Town Certification") in 1897. The commune of Puerto Varas, as it exists today, was formed in December 1925, when the Ministry of the Interior divided the country into provinces, and communes.

Demographics
According to population projections from Chile’s National Statistics Institute, in 2012 the commune of Puerto Varas had 41,255 inhabitants (21,093 men and 20,162 women). The population had increased by 25% since the 2002 census.

Architecture
Puerto Varas is characterized by traditional German architecture, with houses built from alerce wood using tools brought over from Europe by the 19th century colonial inhabitants. It was designated a Zona Típica (heritage zone) in 1992 and has a number of protected buildings, including the Iglesia del Sagrado Corazón de Jesus (Sacred Heart of Jesus Church). Built in 1918 on one of the highest points in Puerto Varas, the wooden church is one of the city’s iconic landmarks. Other notable protected structures include Casa Kuschel (1915) and Casa Yunge (1932).

Culture
Cultural institutions in Puerto Varas include the Antonio Felmer Museum, the Molino Machmar Art Centre, the Nativo Bosque Gallery and the Pablo Fierro Museum. Nearby Frutillar hosts the annual Frutillar Musical Weeks in January and February.

Cuisine

Puerto Varas is known for traditional German dishes, especially Kuchen, which is celebrated on the annual Kuchen Day on the first Saturday of February. Craft beers, pastries, cakes, chocolate and marmalades can also be found in the town’s shops, restaurants and cafes.

Tourism
Puerto Varas is a popular tourist destination with its distinctive German-inspired architecture, wide variety of hotels and inns, a casino, a beach and striking views over the lake to the Osorno and Calbuco volcanoes.

Visitors can take part in a range of outdoor sports including kayaking, fishing and trekking, and there is a winter ski centre on the slopes of Osorno Volcano. It is a good base for excursions to nearby natural landmarks including the emerald Todos los Santos Lake, the picturesque Petrohué Falls (Spanish: Saltos de Petrohué), Vicente Pérez Rosales National Park and Puyehue National Park as well as Osorno Volcano. Trips are also possible to other towns around Llanquihue Lake including Frutillar, Puerto Octay and Llanquihue.

Puerto Varas is the starting point for bus-and-boat crossings of the Andes, through spectacular forested mountains reflected in shimmering lakes, to San Carlos de Bariloche, Argentina. The trip is best made west to east with an overnight at a hotel in the midst of the wilderness.

Education
International schools
Instituto Aleman Puerto Varas

Transportation

Conveniently nearby, El Tepual International Airport for Puerto Montt is served by many daily non-stop flights from Santiago, as well as numerous flights from other cities. More than 1,100,000 passengers a year use the airport.

Administration
As a commune, Puerto Varas is a third-level administrative division of Chile administered by a municipal council headed by an alcalde who is directly elected every four years. The 2012–2016 alcalde is Álvaro Berger Schmidt (PS).

Within the electoral divisions of Chile, Puerto Varas is represented in the Chamber of Deputies by Fidel Espinoza (PS) and Felipe DeMussy Hiriart (UDI). It is part of the 56th electoral district, together with Puyehue, Río Negro, Purranque, Puerto Octay, Fresia, Frutillar, Llanquihue and Los Muermos. The commune is represented in the Senate by Rabindranath Quinteros (PS) and Iván Moreira (UDI) as part of the 17th senatorial constituency (Los Lagos Region).

Geography

Climate
Summers are mild and winters are rainy and somewhat chilly.

Photo gallery

References

External links

  Municipality of Puerto Varas
  Lago Llanquihue weather forecasts
  Puerto Varas – Virtual Reality Panorama in 360ª
 how to get to Puerto Varas from El Tepual Airport

Llanquihue Province
Communes of Chile
Populated lakeshore places in Chile
Populated places established in 1853
Populated places in Llanquihue Province
1853 establishments in Chile
Los Lagos Region